Oro alla Patria ("Gold to the Fatherland") was a 1935 Italian fascist campaign that asked Italians to donate their gold assets to fundraise for their homeland. Faced with League of Nations sanctions for its Second Italo-Ethiopian War, the Fascist government collected 250,000 wedding rings from Rome and 180,000 from Milan, amid other personal gold jewelry and objects totaling 33,600 kilograms of gold and 93,400 of silver. In acts of sacrifice for the state, prominent figures donated items of great symbolic value: the Queen's wedding ring, the Prince's collar of the Annunciation, the dramatist Luigi Pirandello's Nobel Prize, Guglielmo Marconi's senator medal, and Mussolini's Rocca delle Caminate castle statue busts.

References

Further reading 

 

1935 in Italy
Italian Fascism
Gold objects
Fundraising events